Jacksontown is a census-designated place (CDP) in central Licking Township, Licking County, Ohio, United States.  It has a post office with the ZIP code 43030.  It lies at the intersection of U.S. Route 40 with State Route 13.

Jacksontown is the birthplace of Carl Osburn, winner of five Olympic gold medals, four silver medals and two bronze. It is also the headquarters for the Ohio Department of Transportation's (ODOT) District 5.

Demographics

History
Jacksontown was originally called Jackson, and under the latter name was laid out in 1829. The community was named after Andrew Jackson, seventh President of the United States.  A post office has been in operation under the name Jacksontown since 1831.

References

Census-designated places in Licking County, Ohio
Census-designated places in Ohio
1829 establishments in Ohio
Populated places established in 1829